Sharnal Street station was a railway station between High Halstow Halt and Beluncle Halt on the Hundred of Hoo Railway.

Original station
It was opened on 1 April 1882 and closed to passengers on 4 December 1961 and freight on 20 August 1962. It originally only had one platform, a second platform was built in 1935. The station buildings were demolished in 1967.

Proposed new station
Medway Council have proposed a new station at Sharnal Street to serve residential development on the Hoo Peninsula. The council has secured funding from the Housing Infrastructure Fund for the station and a link road.

References

External links
 Sharnal Street station on navigable 1940 O. S. map

Disused railway stations in Kent
Former South Eastern Railway (UK) stations
Railway stations in Great Britain opened in 1882
Railway stations in Great Britain closed in 1961
Transport in Medway
Proposed railway stations in England